is a Japanese professional boxer who held the WBO Asia Pacific mini-flyweight title from 2019 until 2021. As of June 2022, he is ranked as the world's eighth best active mini-flyweight by the Transnational Boxing Rankings Board and sixth by BoxRec.

Early life and amateur career
Ginjiro Shigeoka was born on 18 October 1999 in Kumamoto, Japan, where his family own a painting business. He has three siblings. His introduction to combat sports was through karate while in kindergarten. He began boxing at the Honda Fitness Boxing Gym at the age of 10, giving up karate two years later in order to focus on boxing.

As an amateur he won five national titles and compiled a record of 56–1 (17 KOs). His only loss came to his older brother, Yudai Shigeoka. The brothers were scheduled to face each other in the final of a domestic tournament but agreed not to fight, with Ginjiro's corner throwing in the towel as the bell rang to signal the start of the first round.

Professional career

Early career
Shigeoka was scheduled to make his professional debut against Sanchai Yotboon on September 25, 2018. He won the fight by a third-round technical knockout. Shigeoka was awarded the East Japan Boxing Association September MVP award for this victory.

Shigeoka was scheduled to face Gerttipong Kumsahwat on February 26, 2019. He won the fight by a first-round knockout, needing a little over a minute and a half to finish his opponent. Shigeoka was next scheduled to fight Joel Lino on April 14, 2019. He extended his winning streak to three fights with a unanimous decision victory.

Regional mini-flyweight champion

WBO Asia Pacific champion
Shigeoka was scheduled to face Clyde Azarcon for the vacant World Boxing Organisation Asia Pacific Minimumweight title on July 27, 2019. He won the fight by a first-round knockout, stopping Azarcon at the 1:12 minute mark. Shigeoka made the first defense of his WBO Asia Pacific title against Rey Loreto on December 31, 2019, on the undercard of the Kazuto Ioka and Jeyvier Cintrón WBO World Super Fly title match. He won the fight by a fifth-round knockout.

Shigeoka was scheduled to make his second title defense, following a 19 month absence from the sport, against the undefeated Toshiki Kawamitsu on July 14, 2021, in his first career main event. He won the fight by a second-round technical knockout. Shigeoka vacated the WBO Asia Pacific minumumweight title on August 4, 2021.

Japanese champion
Shigeoka was booked to face Tatsuro Nakashima on 27 March 2022, at the City Gym in Tomigusuku, Japan, for the vacant Japanese minimumweight title. He won the fight by unanimous decision, with scores of 99–91, 99–91 and 98–92. Shigeoka made his first title defense against the one-time Japanese mini-flyweight title challenger Naoya Haruguchi on July 7, 2022. Shigeoka had a strong start to the bout, and began to take over from the third round onward, stopping Haruguchi with a flurry of punches at the 1:48 minute mark of the fourth round. He vacated the Japanese title on July 29, 2022.

Title challenge

Shigeoka vs. Valladares
Shigeoka was booked to challenge the reigning IBF mini flyweight titleholder Daniel Valladares. The fight was booked to take place on the undercard of the Masataka Taniguchi and Melvin Jerusalem light flyweight title bout on January 6, 2022, at the Osaka Prefectural Gymnasium in Osaka, Japan. The fight was stopped at the 2:48 minute mark of the third round, after an accidental headbutt left the champion unable to continue competing. The fight was ruled a no contest. All three judges scored the fight an even 19–19 at the time of the stoppage. Event organizer Kōki Kameda stated during the post-fight press conference that he would try to arrange a rematch for the April of the same year.

Shigeoka vs. Cuatro
After his no-contest bout with Valladares, Shigeoka and his team sent a request for a rematch to the IBF through the Japan Boxing Commission. As Valladares was unable to make his second title defense due to an injury, the IBF instead ordered Shigeoka to face the former IBF mini-flyweight titleholder Rene Mark Cuarto for the interim championship. The bout is scheduled to take place on April 16, 2023, at the Yoyogi National Gymnasium in Tokyo, Japan.

Professional boxing record

See also
 List of male boxers

References

Living people
1999 births
Japanese male boxers
Sportspeople from Kumamoto Prefecture
Mini-flyweight boxers
21st-century Japanese people